Sir James Frederick Rees (13 December 1883 – 7 January 1967), known as Frederick Rees, was a Welsh historian and academic born in Milford Haven, who specialised in economic history and the history of Wales. From 1929 to 1949, he was Principal of University College of South Wales and Monmouthshire. He was additionally Vice-Chancellor of the University of Wales from 1935 to 1937 and also from 1944 to 1946. He had previously lectured at University College, Bangor, Queen's University Belfast, the University of Edinburgh, and the University of Birmingham. He served as High Sheriff of Pembrokeshire for 1955.

Honours
In the 1945 New Year Honours, Rees was appointed a Knight Bachelor, and thereby granted the title sir, in recognition of his service as Principal of the University College of South Wales and Monmouthshire, Cardiff and as Vice-Chancellor of the University of Wales. He was knighted by King George VI during a ceremony at Buckingham Palace.

Selected works

References

 

 
 
 
 
 
 

1883 births
1967 deaths
People from Milford Haven
20th-century Welsh historians
Economic historians
Historians of Wales
Academics of Bangor University
Academics of Queen's University Belfast
Academics of the University of Edinburgh
Academics of the University of Birmingham
Academics of Cardiff University
Vice-Chancellors of the University of Wales
High Sheriffs of Pembrokeshire
Knights Bachelor